Acetyltransferase (or transacetylase) is a type of transferase enzyme that transfers an acetyl group.

Examples include:
 Histone acetyltransferases including CBP histone acetyltransferase
 Choline acetyltransferase
 Chloramphenicol acetyltransferase
 Serotonin N-acetyltransferase
 NatA Acetyltransferase
 NatB acetyltransferase

See also
 Acyltransferase
 Acetylation

External links
 

Transferases